Ben A. Davis is an American art critic who is known for his writing on politics, economics, and contemporary art, and for his book 9.5 Theses on Art and Class (2013). In 2022, Haymarket Books published his second book, Art in the After-Culture: Capitalist Crisis and Cultural Strategy. Like 9.5 Theses on Art and Class, Art in the After-Culture is a collection of his cultural essays.

Career
Davis was executive editor of the art news website Artinfo from 2010 to 2013, and before that associate editor of Artnet Magazine from 2005 to 2010. He is currently the National Art Critic for the art news website Artnet News.

As an independent writer, his work about art has appeared widely in publications including Adbusters, Frieze, New York, Slate, and The Village Voice.

Davis was one of the editors of The Elements of Architecture, the catalogue for the 2014 Venice Architecture Biennale, curated by Rem Koolhaas.

In 2015, The New Yorker art critic Peter Schjeldahl has referred to Davis as “among the excellent younger critics now.”

9.5 Theses on Art and Class (Pamphlet)
In 2009, Davis wrote the pamphlet 9.5 Theses on Art and Class as an intervention into the art show titled #class at Winkleman Gallery in New York City, which set out to explore how artistic success is determined by economics. The discussion generated by the pamphlet drew notice in The New York Times, and was “one of the most talked about sessions” of the #class show, according to Sarah Thornton. 9.5 Theses on Art and Class was later translated into Spanish and Romanian.

9.5 Theses on Art and Class (Book)
9.5 Theses on Art and Class, a collection of Davis’s essays including the title pamphlet, was published by Haymarket Books in 2013. Upon its publication, 9.5 Theses on Art and Class received positive notice in both the mainstream and art press. The Stranger concluded its review by saying, “We should hold town hall meetings on this book.”  The Village Voice faulted Davis for “too readily” using Marxism as an explanatory model, but concluded, “On 9.5 Theses, the verdict is crystal: This is one helluva pamphlet.”  9.5 Theses on Art and Class was featured in New York magazine’s “Approval Matrix” on July 13, 2013, which called it a “riveting manifesto.” 

The book has been credited with “[bringing] the discussion of class, artists, and the art market center stage in a way that [goes] beyond fleeting auction reports and perpetual gallery gripes.”

References

External links 

21st-century American non-fiction writers
American art critics
American male non-fiction writers
Living people
Year of birth missing (living people)
Place of birth missing (living people)
21st-century American male writers